In mathematics, the restriction of a function  is a new function, denoted  or  obtained by choosing a smaller domain  for the original function  
The function  is then said to extend

Formal definition

Extensions

That is, if  and 

A  (respectively, etc.) of a function  is an extension of  that is also a linear map (respectively, a continuous map, etc.).

Examples

 The restriction of the non-injective function to the domain  is the injection
 The factorial function is the restriction of the gamma function to the positive integers, with the argument shifted by one:

Properties of restrictions

 Restricting a function  to its entire domain  gives back the original function, that is, 
 Restricting a function twice is the same as restricting it once, that is, if  then 
 The restriction of a continuous function is continuous.

Applications

Inverse functions

For a function to have an inverse, it must be one-to-one. For example, the function

(If we instead restrict to the domain  then the inverse is the negative of the square root of )  Alternatively, there is no need to restrict the domain if we allow the inverse to be a multivalued function.

Selection operators

In relational algebra, a selection (sometimes called a restriction to avoid confusion with SQL's use of SELECT) is a unary operation written as
 or  where:
  is a binary operation in the set 
  is a value constant,
  is a relation.

Thus, the selection operator restricts to a subset of the entire database.

The pasting lemma

The pasting lemma is a result in topology that relates the continuity of a function with the continuity of its restrictions to subsets.

Let  be two closed subsets (or two open subsets) of a topological space  such that  and let  also be a topological space. If  is continuous when restricted to both  and  then  is continuous.

This result allows one to take two continuous functions defined on closed (or open) subsets of a topological space and create a new one.

Sheaves

Sheaves provide a way of generalizing restrictions to objects besides functions.

In sheaf theory, one assigns an object  in a category to each open set  of a topological space, and requires that the objects satisfy certain conditions. The most important condition is that there are restriction morphisms between every pair of objects associated to nested open sets; that is, if  then there is a morphism  satisfying the following properties, which are designed to mimic the restriction of a function:
 For every open set  of  the restriction morphism  is the identity morphism on 
 If we have three open sets  then the composite 
 (Locality) If  is an open  covering of an open set  and if  are such that s|Ui = t|Ui for each set  of the covering, then ; and

The collection of all such objects is called a sheaf. If only the first two properties are satisfied, it is a pre-sheaf.

Left- and right-restriction

These cases do not fit into the scheme of sheaves.

Anti-restriction

See also

References

Sheaf theory